Shirata (written: 白田) is a Japanese surname. Notable people with the surname include:

, Japanese actress and fashion model
, Japanese sprint canoeist
Yoshiko Shirata (born 1952), Japanese accounting scholar

Japanese-language surnames